Lloyd Irving Rudolph (November 1, 1927 – January 16, 2016) was an American political economist, political scientist, author, political thinker, educationist and the Professor Emeritus of Political Science at the University of Chicago, known for his scholarship and writings on the India social and political milieu. The Government of India, in 2014, honored Lloyd Rudolph and his wife, Susanne Hoeber Rudolph, for their services to literature and education, by bestowing on them the third highest civilian award, the Padma Bhushan.

Biography

Lloyd Rudolph was born on November 1, 1927, to Norman Charles Rudolph and Bertha Margolin. He graduated with a BA in 1948 from Harvard University and continued at Harvard's Kennedy School of Government to secure his MPA in 1950. Six years later, in 1956, he obtained his PhD from Harvard University, itself, based on his thesis, The Meaning of Party: From the Politics of Status to the Politics of Opinion in Eighteenth Century England and America.

Rudolph joined the University of Chicago in 1964 where he served in various capacities for 34 years. He retired from the university and became Professor Emeritus in 2002.

Rudolph married Susanne Hoeber, his longtime friend, co-author and colleague, on July 19, 1952. The couple has three children, Jenny, Amelia and Matthew. The couple, after their retirement from the University of Chicago, alternates their residence in their homes in the US and  Jaipur, India, where they have found a home in Jaipur. He died from prostate cancer on January 16, 2016.

Career

Lloyd Rudolph started his career in 1948 when he was chosen as the group leader for a summer camp, Experiment in International Living, in France which he attended once again in 1951. On his return from France, he enrolled as the Research Assistant to Bertram Gross, the executive director of Council of Economic Advisers, Executive Office of the President and worked there till 1949. The next assignment was as Administrative Assistant to Emil J. Sady, Chief, Pacific Branch, Office of Territories, Department of the Interior.

His teaching career began in 1951, as Teaching Fellow, Department of Government, Harvard University. Till 1954, Rudolph continued as both resident and non-resident tutor there and followed it with a stint in the military, from 1954 to 1956, as the First Lieutenant, U.S.A., Adjutant General's Corps. In 1956, he returned to teaching at Harvard as the Instructor in 1957 at the Department of Government, Harvard University and was promoted, 1960, as the Allston Burr senior tutor at the Dunster House of the university. In 1964, he became the associate professor of political science and the social sciences, Department of Political Science and the college at the University of Chicago, promoted as professor in 1972 and retired from there in 2002. On his retirement, he was made the professor emeritus of political science.

Positions held
 Chair of the Committee on International Relations — University of Chicago
 Master of Arts programme in the social Sciences — University of Chicago
 Chair of concentrations in Political Science, Public Policy, International Studies and South Asian Studies — University of Chicago
 Chairman - Leonard D. White Award Committee, American Political Science Association, 1969
 Member — Group for the Study of the Psycho-Historical Process, 1966–68
 Member — Discussion Group on South Asia, Council on Foreign Relations, 1971–72
 Member — Overseers Visiting Committee, Department of Government, Harvard University, 1978–81
 Member — Study Group on Nuclear Proliferation in South Asia, Carnegie Endowment for International Peace, Washington, D.C., 1987–88
 Member — Contemporary Affairs Advisory Committee, Asia Society, 1989–92
 Member — The Association for Asian Studies
 Member - Council on Foreign Relations (New York)
 Member — Chicago Council on Foreign Relations

Legacy
Lloyd and Susanne Rudolph's associations with the University of Chicago and India have assisted in the university's decision to open a major academic centre in New Delhi. The centre is envisaged to act as a platform for mutual support and collaboration between students and scholars from India and Chicago in the areas of academics and research.

Awards and recognition
 Padma Bhushan - 2014
 Professor Emeritus of the University of Chicago
 India Abroad Friend of India Award -

Works
Lloyd Rudolph published eight books, all co-authored with his wife, Susanne Rudolph. The writings of the duo were compiled by Oxford University Press, in 2008, into a three-volume publication under the name, Explaining Indian Democracy: A Fifty-Year Perspective.
 

The other major works by Lloyd Rudolph are:
 
 
 
 
 
 
 
 

Lloyd Rudolph wrote articles prolifically on India and political science, in general. These include:

References

External links
 
 
 
 
 

1927 births
2016 deaths
Harvard Kennedy School alumni
Recipients of the Padma Bhushan in literature & education
American political scientists
American educational theorists
Writers from Chicago